Astartoseris is a monotypic genus of flowering plants belonging to the family Asteraceae. It only contains one known species, Astartoseris triquetra.

It is native to Cyprus, Lebanon and Syria.

The genus name of Astartoseris is in honour of Astarte, the Hellenized form of the Ancient Near Eastern goddess Ashtart or Athtart (Northwest Semitic), a deity closely related to Ishtar (East Semitic), worshipped from the Bronze Age through classical antiquity. The Latin specific epithet of triquetra means three cornered.
Both the genus and the species were first described and published in Willdenowia Vol.47 on page 120 in 2017.

References

Asteraceae
Monotypic Asteraceae genera
Plants described in 2017
Flora of Cyprus
Flora of Lebanon
Flora of Syria